Gobichettipalayam division is one of the two revenue divisions in Erode district of Tamil Nadu State, India. This Division comprises six Taluks divided into nine CD blocks. 

The six taluks are as follows:
 Anthiyur taluk
 Bhavani taluk
 Gobichettipalayam taluk
 Nambiyur taluk
 Sathyamangalam taluk 
 Thalavadi taluk. 

According to 2011 census, division has a population of 11,65,408 with an area of 3,745 Sq km.

References 
 

Erode district